Ben Klibreck is a Scottish mountain located in central Sutherland. It is an isolated hill, rising above a large area of moorland. The highest point, Meall nan Con (the mound of the dogs), rises to  elevation and is therefore the second most northerly Munro after Ben Hope. The western side of the hill is a fairly uniform steep, heathery slope, while the eastern side has a series of large, grassy corries and has been described as having more character.

Numerous ascents of Ben Klibreck are possible. It can be climbed from Crask to the south or Altnaharra to the north, but the easiest and most popular route is from the A836 to the west, by way of Loch nan Uan and up steep slopes to the summit ridge, which is then followed to the summit.

References 

Munros
Marilyns of Scotland
Mountains and hills of the Northwest Highlands
Mountains and hills of Highland (council area)